Springwood is a town in the Blue Mountains, New South Wales, Australia. Springwood is located 72 kilometres west of the Sydney CBD in the local government area of the City of Blue Mountains.

Springwood is near the Blue Mountains National Park and the Greater Blue Mountains Area World Heritage Site. It is 371 metres above sea level and, like most of the towns in the vicinity, is located on a narrow ridge between two gorges. Winmalee is to the north. Springwood railway station sits between Valley Heights and Faulconbridge on the Blue Mountains railway line.

History
The Springwood area was first occupied by the Oryang-Ora Aboriginal people belonging to the wider Darug Aboriginal tribe of the wider Sydney region. They settled the area about 40,000 years ago, with many rock carvings and art sites in the area. At the time of settlement the chief of the clan was Oryang Jack who was drawn by French artist Pellier.

"Oryang-Ora" was also the reference to the area that marked the dividing ridge line between the Darug tribes of the north and the Gundungurra tribes to the south in the Blue Mountains area.
 
In 1815, Governor Lachlan Macquarie and his wife stopped by what Macquarie called a spring. The place was later named Springwood: "Spring" from the springs in the area, and "wood" from the local Mountain Blue Gums (Eucalyptus deanei) of the area. As a town developed, the main street was named Macquarie Road, after Governor Macquarie.

The first railway line was put through the Blue Mountains in 1867, and the Springwood station was built in 1868. This station was replaced by a more substantial building in the Victorian Gothic style, constructed in 1884 under the direction of John Whitton, Chief Engineer of NSW Railways; a porter's cottage was constructed just west of the station. Springwood Station is the second-oldest surviving station in the Blue Mountains. It is listed on the (now defunct) Register of the National Estate as well as having a New South Wales heritage listing.

In 1892, James Hunter Lawson built Braemar, a large, single-storey house situated on a sixty-acre property on Macquarie Road.  Braemar started as a family residence, but later became a convalescent home, a boarding house, a private home again and a guesthouse. It was acquired by the Blue Mountains City Council in 1974, restored as a Bicentennial project and reopened in 1988. It serves as a community gallery and centre, staffed by volunteers. The local library is housed in a new building behind Braemar.

Christ Church Anglican Church was built on the Great Western Highway from 1888 to 1889, with extensions in the 1960s and 1980s. It was designed by the architect Sir John Sulman, who had a holiday residence at Lawson. Designed in the Victorian Academic Gothic style, the church is the oldest Anglican church building in the Blue Mountains and is heritage-listed. The house originally built as a vicarage, but only used as a private residence known as Southall, is also heritage-listed. The Presbyterian Church building, a sandstone Gothic building located on Macquarie Road, was built in 1895. The Catholic community was originally part of the Penrith parish, but were given their own building in 1892: St Thomas Aquinas Church. The church has since relocated to St Columba's grounds, Winmalee.

Heritage listings 
Springwood has a number of heritage-listed sites, including:
 Blue Mountains National Park: Blue Mountains walking tracks
 345-347 Great Western Highway: Christ Church Anglican Church, Springwood
 39 Hawkesbury Road: Buckland Convalescent Home
 Main Western railway: Springwood railway station

October 2013 bushfires 

A small part of Springwood, along with larger parts of the adjacent town of Winmalee and nearby village of Yellow Rock were badly affected by bushfires in October 2013. 193 residential properties were destroyed, and 109 damaged in those localities.

Commercial area and transport

Springwood's commercial area centres around Macquarie Road which runs parallel to the Great Western Highway and the railway line. The Springwood & District Chamber of Commerce represents retailers, businesses, services and not-for-profit organisations in Springwood and surrounding areas.
Springwood railway station is on the Blue Mountains Line of the NSW TrainLink intercity network. 
Blue Mountains Transit provides daily bus services through Springwood from Penrith and Katoomba, in addition to various bus routes from Springwood to Burns Road, Springwood Hospital, Hazelbrook, Winmalee and Yellow Rock.

Education
The town is serviced by three high schools, Springwood High School, Winmalee High School and St. Columba's High School, as well as private and selective high schools in other suburbs. Springwood is also serviced by five primary schools: Ellison Public School, Faulconbridge Public School, Winmalee Public School, Springwood Public School and St Thomas Aquinas Primary School.

Churches

 Anglican Churches Springwood [The parish centres include  Christ Church Anglican Church (1888) and the Factory (2004)]
 Springwood Baptist
 Springwood Presbyterian meeting at Frazer Presbyterian Church (1895)
 Springwood Salvation Army
 Springwood Uniting Church
 St. Thomas Aquinas Catholic Church
 Lutheran Springwood
 Strong Nation Churches (Blue Mountains)

Climate
Despite its location in the temperate oceanic Blue Mountains region, Springwood has a humid subtropical climate (Cfa). Unlike the upper Blue Mountains area, it generally has mild winters and warm summers. Although Springwood's elevation is at 371 m (1,217 ft), its winter nights are warmer than those of Penrith and Richmond in the lower Sydney metropolitan area, which lie on the footsteps of the Blue Mountains. This is mainly because cool air from the mountains sinks to the Cumberland Plain, thus cooling these suburbs at night. Unlike these aforementioned Sydney suburbs, which border the Blue Mountains, Springwood has a higher annual rainfall amount. Winter and early spring is relatively drier due to the foehn effect from the Great Dividing Range which block rainfall that are brought on by westerly cold fronts.

Furthermore, Springwood can suffer bushfire damage during the spring and summer months due to it being located in, and surrounded by, a predominant eucalyptus woodland area which encompass the Blue Mountains region.

Celebrations and events
The town's annual celebration, Foundation Day, occurs in late March to early April.

Springwood is also the site of a notable Anzac Day Parade.

The Blue Mountains Vietnam Veterans' Association conducts the largest annual parade and Memorial Service for Vietnam veterans in Australasia at Springwood, on the third Sunday of August, to coincide with the anniversary of the Battle of Long Tan.

Springwood Australia Day Festival, conducted by Lower Mountains Fundraising Events Inc., is held in the grounds of Springwood Public School and involves local entertainers on two stages, food and market stalls and amusement rides.

Springwood Springtopia Festival is held on the first Saturday of September with a similar format to Australia Day.

Parks and recreation

Springwood has some parklands with bushwalks often leading into wilderness areas. 
Fairy Dell is located immediately south of the township and has some tracks leading into the Blue Mountains World Heritage area. The Deanei Reserve is another bushland area which is located east of the township and hosts the threatened and endangered Blue Mountains Shalecap Forest. There are also bushland walks in this bushland Reserve.

Buttenshaw Park is also a recreational area which hosts an arboretum, play structures and the Springwood Pool.

Summerhayes Park is a public reserve located in Winmalee, which is used for sport and recreational activities. Its facilities include tennis and netball courts, a newly built skate park and fields for football (soccer). It is the home of Springwood United Football Club (formerly Springwood Soccer & Sports Club) and Springwood Netball Club. Summerhayes Park has diverse native flora and fauna and contains many threatened/endangered species and ecological communities. It is also a bushwalking area with many tracks, vistas and aboriginal archeological sites.

Braemar Gallery opened in 1988. It serves as a community gallery. The venue hosts different exhibitions each month, showcasing local and regional artists' works. Braemar House, where the gallery is situated in, is said to be beautiful and known to be historic.

Population 

Springwood is the largest town in the lower Blue Mountains. According to the 2016 Census, there were 8,475 people living in Springwood including 3,938 males (46.4%) and 4,540 females (53.6%). 79.7% of people were born in Australia. The next most common countries of birth were England 6.9% and New Zealand 1.5%. 91.5% of people only spoke English at home. The Aboriginal and Torres Strait Islander population of Springwood is 147 or 1.7% of the total population. The most common responses for religion were No Religion, so described 32.2%, Catholic 20.9% and Anglican 18.7%.

See also
 List of Blue Mountains subjects

Notable people
Notable people from or who have lived in Springwood include:
 Gerry Harvey, entrepreneur
 Andrew Hinson, rugby league player 
 Julia Jacklin, singer-songwriter
 Amanda Spratt, professional cyclist 
 Graham Toulmin AM, dental clinic philanthropist
 Wendy Toulmin AM, dental clinic philanthropist

References

 
Towns in New South Wales